Ein Sof, or Eyn Sof (meaning "infinite"), in Kabbalah, is understood as God prior to any self-manifestation in the production of any spiritual realm, probably derived from Solomon ibn Gabirol's ( 1021 –  1070) term, "the Endless One" (she-en lo tiklah). Ein Sof may be translated as "unending", "(there is) no end", or infinity. It was first used by Azriel ( 1160 –  1238), who, sharing the Neoplatonic belief that God can have no desire, thought, word, or action, emphasized by it the negation of any attribute. Of the Ein Sof, nothing ("Ein") can be grasped ("Sof"-limitation). It is the origin of the Ohr Ein Sof, the "Infinite Light" of paradoxical divine self-knowledge, nullified within the Ein Sof prior to creation. In Lurianic Kabbalah, the first act of creation, the Tzimtzum self "withdrawal" of God to create an "empty space", takes place from there. In Hasidic Judaism, the Tzimtzum is only the illusionary concealment of the Ohr Ein Sof, giving rise to monistic panentheism. Consequently, Hasidism focuses on the Atzmus divine essence, rooted higher within the Godhead than the Ein Sof, which is limited to infinitude, and reflected in the essence (etzem) of the Torah and the soul.

Explanation
The Zohar explains the term "Ein Sof" as follows: 

In other words, "Ein Sof" signifies "the nameless being". In another passage the Zohar reduces the term to "Ein" (non-existent), because God so transcends human understanding as to be practically non-existent.

In addition to the Sefer Yetzirah and the Zohar, other well-known explications of the relation between Ein Sof and all other realities and levels of reality have been formulated by the Jewish mystical thinkers of the Middle Ages, such as Isaac the Blind and Azriel. Judah Ḥayyaṭ, in his commentary Minḥat Yehudah on the Ma'areket Elahut, gives the following explanation of the term "Ein Sof":

The Ten Sefirot

According to Gershom Scholem, the Ein Sof is the emanator of the ten sefirot. Sefirot are energy emanations found on the Kabbalistic Tree of Life. Ein Sof, the Atik Yomin ("Ancient of Days"), emanates the sefirot into the cosmic womb of the Ayin in a manner that results in the created universe. The three letters composing the word "Ayin" (אי״ן), indicate the first three purely intellectual sefirot, which precede any emotion or action. The order of devolution can be described as:

The ten sefirot were preceded by a stage of concealment called tzimtzum, which "allows space" for creations to perceive themselves as separate existences from their creator. The sefirot exhibit reflection in sets of triads between more exalted states of being (or "non-being," when "otherness" does not yet exist) and the lower, more mundane levels of existence:
 Ayin, Ein Sof, Ohr Ein Sof
 Keter, Chokhmah, Binah
 Chesed, Gevurah, Tiferet
 Netzach, Hod, Yesod

Concerned that misinterpretation could lead to the idolatrous belief of duality or multiplicity in God, the Kabbalists frequently stress that the sefirot are bound up in the Ein Sof, and that without the Ein Sof the sefirot have no existence. However, there is an apparent contradiction, since in Kabbalah, the sefirot are sometimes called divine in themselves, despite the assertion that they are only vehicles to manifest God. Moses ben Jacob Cordovero, who gave the first full systemization of Kabbalah in the 16th century, resolved the contradiction, explaining that the sefirot consist of lights invested in vessels. In detail, whereas the vessels are differentiated vehicles for creation, the light is the undifferentiated light of the Ein Sof. This is similar to how water poured into differently-shaped vessels will take on the vessels' forms, or how light streaming through different colors of glass appears in different colors. Despite the change in appearance, the water and the light emanate from a single source and are essentially unchanged; the vessels merely serve to filter and veil the light to reveal different aspects of the creator, and to permit creations to benefit from his light. This explanation was accepted and expanded upon in later works of Kabbalah and Hasidic philosophy.

Atzmus

Hasidic Judaism in the 18th century internalised the esoteric, transcendent emanations of Kabbalah into immanent, psychological perception and correspondence. The term in Hasidic philosophy for the divine source is Atzmus ("essence"). While the Ein Sof of Kabbalah can only be infinite, Atzmus, rooted higher in the Godhead, is beyond finite/infinite duality. As the Etzem, it both transcends all levels, and permeates all levels. This is reflected in the paradoxical acosmic monism of Hasidic panentheism, and relates to the essence of the Torah and the soul. In Hasidic thought, Kabbalah corresponds to the World of Atzilus, the sephirah of Chochmah and the transcendent soul level of Chayah; Hasidic philosophy corresponds to the World of Adam Kadmon, the sephirah of Keter and the soul essence of Yechidah. The Baal Shem Tov taught that the only reflection of Atzmus is the sincerity of the soul in performing the Jewish observances and prayer. Consequently, Hasidism gave new emphasis to the common folk, and to prayer and action over traditionally pre-eminent Torah study, as Atzmus is most reflected in the lowest levels, the purpose of creation in making a "dwelling place" for God in the lowest realms. In response, Chaim Volozhin, the main theological theorist of the Misnagdim, opposed Hasidic panentheism and re-emphasised Talmudic study.

In Modern Hebrew

In Modern Hebrew as spoken in contemporary Israel, "ein sof" (often  contracted to "einsof" – אינסוף) is commonly used as simply the word for "infinity", without reference to God and to the above intricate Kabbalistic connotations.

See also
 Apeiron
 Ayin and Yesh
 Divine simplicity
 Essence-energies distinction
 God in Judaism
 Hayyi Rabbi
 Panentheism
 Wuji (philosophy)

References

Bibliography

Kabbalistic words and phrases

he:אינסוף (פילוסופיה)#האינסוף בקבלה